The 1999–2000 Welsh Alliance League was the sixteenth season of the Welsh Alliance League after its establishment in 1984. The league was won by Halkyn United.

League table

References

External links
Welsh Alliance League

Welsh Alliance League seasons
3
Wales